Christoph Fürer von Haimendorf may refer to:
Christoph Fürer von Haimendorf (1663–1732), German poet
Christoph Fürer von Haimendorf, better known as Christoph von Fürer-Haimendorf, (1909–1995), Austrian ethnologist